Lazonby & Kirkoswald is a railway station on the Settle and Carlisle Line, which runs between  and  via . It is owned by Network Rail and managed by Northern Trains.

History
The station was opened by the Midland Railway on 1 May 1876. The station was designed by the Midland Railway company architect John Holloway Sanders.

Originally named Lazonby, it was renamed Lazonby & Kirkoswald on 22 July 1895. It is situated in the centre of Lazonby and, like many other stations on the line, was closed on 4 May 1970 when local passenger services between Skipton and Carlisle were withdrawn. The platforms and buildings survived however, and following several years of use by DalesRail excursions it was reopened on a full-time basis in July 1986. The old goods shed and yard is now used by a local bakery.

The southbound platform has a stone shelter and access ramps from the nearby road (so it is fully DDA-compliant).  On the northbound platform, there is a bus-style waiting shelter. There is no ticket machine (though one is planned for the station by the end of 2019 as part of TOC Northern's wider programme of station improvements) or booking office, so tickets have to be bought in advance or on the train.  Train running information is available via information boards and posters and a telephone helpline (PIS displays are also due to be installed by the end of 2019).

Stationmasters

W. Clow 1876 - 1877
John Francis Westcott 1877 - 1884
J.W. Coltman 1884 - 1890
Thomas Wakefield 1890 - 1897 (formerly station master at Langwathby)
Mark A. Hall. 1897 - 1902  (afterwards station master at Radlett)
Frederick Clarke 1902 - 1925
Richard William Powell 1925 - 1931 (afterwards station master at Appleby)
J. Brunskill ca. 1940 ca. 1958

Services

As of the May 2021 timetable change, the station is served by eight trains per day (six on Sunday) towards Carlisle. Heading towards Leeds via Settle, there are seven trains per day (six on Sunday). All services are operated by Northern Trains.

Rolling stock used: Class 156 Super Sprinter and Class 158 Express Sprinter

Accidents and incidents 

 Services between Appleby (later Armathwaite) and Carlisle were suspended from 9 February 2016, due to a landslip north of the station at Eden Brows. The station served as the northern terminus of the Settle and Carlisle Line until 30 March 2017, when the £23 million project to repair the embankment and reinstate the track bed was completed by Network Rail.

Notes

References

External links

 
 

Railway stations in Cumbria
DfT Category F2 stations
Former Midland Railway stations
Railway stations in Great Britain opened in 1876
Railway stations in Great Britain closed in 1970
Railway stations in Great Britain opened in 1986
Reopened railway stations in Great Britain
Northern franchise railway stations
Beeching closures in England